Günlüce may refer to:

 Günlüce, Ceyhan, village in Adana Province, Turkey
 Günlüce, Ödemiş, village in Izmir Province, Turkey
 Günlüce, Oltu
 Günlüce, Posof, village in Ardahan Province, Turkey
 Günlüce, Sason, village in Batman Province, Turkey